The Winthrop Eagles men's basketball team represents Winthrop University in Rock Hill, South Carolina, United States and competes in the Big South Conference. Winthrop plays their home games in the 6,100 seat Winthrop Coliseum.  Winthrop has appeared in 11 NCAA Tournaments and has won 11 conference season championships, 13 conference tournament championships, and 1 conference division title. The Eagles have played 44 seasons of basketball since their inaugural 1978–79 campaign.

Team history

Rise to mid-major prominence 
During the late 1990s and 2000s, Winthrop established itself as one of the most successful mid-major programs in college basketball, reaching the NCAA Tournament eight times in 10 seasons. From 1998 to 2008, the Eagles posted a 216–95 overall record and went 114–28 in Big South play. During this stretch, Winthrop defeated programs from high major conferences like the ACC (Clemson, Georgia Tech, Miami), Big East (Marquette, Notre Dame, Providence), and SEC (Georgia, Mississippi State).

Since 2009, Winthrop has defeated over 30 non-conference D1 teams including: Auburn (SEC), Clemson (ACC), East Carolina, East Tennessee State, Furman, Georgia Southern, Illinois (Big 10), James Madison, Manhattan College, Ohio University, Saint Mary's, St. Louis, UNC Greensboro, Portland, San Diego, Wake Forest (ACC), Washington (PAC 12), and William & Mary. Winthrop beat the ACC, SEC, PAC 12, and Big 10 schools at the opposing school.

Neild Gordon era (1978–1986) 
Winthrop's first head coach, Neild Gordon, recorded 25 wins and 10 losses in the Eagle's first season. He finished with an average win percentage of .615 and 20 wins per season during his tenure at WU. Gordon was later inducted into Winthrop University's Athletics Hall of Fame, the Furman University Athletic Hall of Fame, the National Association of Intercollegiate Athletics (NAIA) Halls of Fame, and the South Carolina Athletic Hall of Fame.

Steve Vacendak era (1986–1992) 
Former Duke point guard and ACC Player of the Year, Steve Vacendak coached the Eagles from 1986 to 1992. In Winthrop's second season as a Division I program, he led the 4th seeded eagles to their first Big South tournament victory.

Dan Kenney era (1993–1998) 
Dan Kenney was the head coach of the Eagles during the mid-1990s and finished his tenure with a record of 51-113. WU athletic director Tom Hickman reportedly said that Kenney "graduated his players, ran a clean, upstanding program and did everything first class but had to be relieved of his coaching duties because the school could no longer carry his losing record."

Gregg Marshall era (1998–2007) 
Gregg Marshall coached the Eagles from 1998 to 2007, engineering one of the great program turnarounds in NCAA history.  In just his first season at the helm, he led the Eagles to a 21–8 record and an appearance in the 1999 Men's Division 1 Tournament. This success continued as his team would go on to make the Tournament in each of the next three seasons, establishing a winning tradition that would last into the 2010s. Overall, he posted a 194–83 overall record during his nine-year tenure. Marshall led the Eagles to a 104–24 conference record, six Big South season titles, and seven Big South tournament titles.  Winthrop appeared in seven NCAA Tournaments, posted six 20-win seasons, and averaged 21.5 victories per year during the Marshall Era. In April 2007, Marshall left Winthrop to become the head coach at Wichita State.

Randy Peele era (2007–2012)
Randy Peele posted a 77–82 overall record (48–38 Big South) as head coach from 2007 to 2012.  He led the Eagles to one Big South season title and two Big South tournament titles. Winthrop appeared in two NCAA Tournaments and notched one 20-win season under Peele's leadership. Randy Peele was relieved of his coaching duties at Winthrop on March 5, 2012.

Pat Kelsey era (2012–2021)
Former Xavier and Wake Forest assistant Pat Kelsey was announced as Winthrop's new coach on March 29, 2012.  Over nine seasons with the Eagles, Kelsey went 186–95 (.662) overall and 110–46 (.705) in the Big South and led Winthrop to three Big South season championships (2016, 2017, 2021), three Big South tournament championships (2017, 2020, 2021), and three Big South Tournament runner-up finishes (2014, 2015, 2016).  In 2020–21, Kelsey's last season with the team, the Eagles went nearly undefeated, finishing 23-2, and led the Big South in assists, steals, points per game, scoring margin, offensive rebounds, defensive rebounds, and rebounding offense.

Under Kelsey, the Eagles' style of play exhibited a fast-paced, high scoring offense and pack line defense. Kelsey's Eagles broke multiple school records in categories such as free throw accuracy, blocked shots, three-pointers made, offensive pace, and points scored in a single game.
With the help of assistant coaches like Brian Kloman, Kelsey developed a successful local and international recruiting pipeline and signed some of the top players in WU's history.  This includes Winthrop's all-time leading rebounder and shot-blocker, Xavier Cooks, and Winthrop's all-time leading scorer, Keon Johnson.  Kelsey's program signed D2 transfer Chandler Vaudrin, the then college national leader in triple-doubles, Josh Corbin and Jamal King, two ESPN 3-star recruits, and D.J. Burns Jr., an ESPN 4-star recruit and transfer from the University of Tennessee. In March 2021, Kelsey left Winthrop to become the head coach at the College of Charleston.

Mark Prosser era (2021–present)
In April 2021, Mark Prosser, former Winthrop assistant and son of Skip Prosser, returned to take the head coach position vacated by Pat Kelsey. Six games into his first season, the Eagles beat the University of Washington to notch Prosser's first win as head coach at WU against a Power 5 conference and Winthrop's first win ever against a PAC-12 team. Additionally, the 2021-2022 team went undefeated at home (13-0) and finished first in the South Division.

2007 Season: Top 25 and Round of 32

Winthrop's greatest success to date was in 2007, as it went 29–5 under Coach Marshall and finished #22 nationally in both the AP and Coaches' Final Polls.  The Eagles posted a perfect 14–0 mark in conference play, winning the Big South regular season championship.  Notable regular season non-conference victories included wins against Mississippi State and Old Dominion.  Each of Winthrop's four regular season losses came at the hand of a Top 25 opponent, with two of the games decided by single-digit margins. They lost to the #2 program in the country (UNC) by seven points.

After winning the Big South Tournament, the Eagles were given a #11 seed in the NCAA Tournament and a First Round matchup against #6 seed Notre Dame.  On March 16, 2007 (day before St. Patrick's Day), Winthrop defeated the Irish by a score of 74–64, becoming the first Big South men's basketball team to win an NCAA Tournament First Round game.  In the Round of 32, the Eagles lost to #3 seed Oregon by a score of 75–61 to close out their season.

Postseason

NCAA tournament results
Winthrop has appeared in 11 NCAA Tournaments and has a combined record of 1–11.  The Eagles advanced to the Round of 32 in 2007, the only Big South team ever to do so.

Conference Championships

1988 Big South (tourney) – Winthrop went 17–13 overall and won the Big South Tournament.
1999 Big South (season & tourney) – Winthrop went 21–8 overall and 9–1 in Big South.
2000 Big South (tourney) – Winthrop went 21–9 overall and 11–3 in Big South.
2001 Big South (tourney) – Winthrop went 18–13 overall and 11–3 in Big South.
2002 Big South (season & tourney) – Winthrop went 19–12 overall and 10–4 in Big South.
2003 Big South (season) – Winthrop went 20–10 overall and 11–3 in Big South.
2005 Big South (season & tourney) – Winthrop went 27–6 overall and 15–1 in Big South.
2006 Big South (season & tourney) – Winthrop went 23–8 overall and 13–3 in Big South.
2007 Big South (season & tourney) – Winthrop went 29–5 overall and 14–0 in Big South.
2008 Big South (season & tourney) – Winthrop went 22–12 overall and 10–4 in Big South.
2010 Big South (tourney) – Winthrop went 19–14 overall and 12–6 in Big South.
2016 Big South (season) – Winthrop went 23–9 overall and 13–5 in Big South.
2017 Big South (season & tourney) – Winthrop went 26–6 overall and 15–3 in Big South.
2020 Big South (season & tourney) – Winthrop went 24–10 overall and 15–3 in Big South.
2021 Big South (season & tourney) – Winthrop went 23-2 overall and 17-1 in Big South.
2022 Big South (division) – Winthrop went 23-9 overall and 16-2 in Big South.

Facilities 
Winthrop Coliseum (1982–present):  6,100-seat multi-purpose arena in Rock Hill, South Carolina.

Player awards

Big South Men's Basketball Player of the Year 
 Fred McKinnon (1986)
Greg Lewis (2002)
 Keon Johnson (2017)
 Xavier Cooks (2018)
Chandler Vaudrin (2021)
D.J. Burns, Jr. (2022)

Big South Men's Basketball Freshman of the Year 
 Tyson Waterman (1996)
Tyrone Walker (2001)
D.J. Burns Jr. (2020)

Big South Men's Basketball Defensive Player of the Year 
 Mantoris Robinson (2009 & 2010)

Big South Men's Basketball All-Decade Team (2010-2019) 
Keon Johnson (2017)
Xavier Cooks (2018)

Kyle Macy Freshman All-America Award 
 D.J. Burns Jr. (2020)

National Association of Basketball Coaches (NABC) First Team (District 3) 
 Chandler Vaudrin (2021)

NCAA Season Statistical Leaders 

 2006-07 - James Shuler made 18 out of 18 free-throws in a single game to lead the nation in highest single game free-throw percentage.
 2007-08 - Michael Jenkins made 12 three-point shots in a single game to lead the nation in most three-point field goals made in a single game.
2018-19 - Winthrop averaged 12.4 made threes to lead the nation in three-point field goals per game.
2019-20 - Chase Claxton shot 81.2% to lead the nation in two-point shooting average.
2019-20 - Winthrop had 1388 rebounds to lead the nation in total rebounds.
2020-21 - Chandler Vaudrin led the nation in triple-doubles at 3 in total.

NBA Summer League Players 

 Pierre Wooten - Denver Nuggets, Charlotte Bobcats, and New Orleans Hornets
Michael Jenkins - Brooklyn Nets
 Jimmy Gavin - Orlando Magic
Xavier Cooks - Golden State Warriors and Phoenix Suns
Chandler Vaudrin - Cleveland Cavaliers
Adonis Arms - Denver Nuggets

FIBA World Cup Players 

Craig Bradshaw - New Zealand (2006)
Xavier Cooks - Australia (2019). Cooks made the Australian Boomers team but did not compete in the 2019 World Cup due to an injury.

Olympians 

Craig Bradshaw, power-forward and center for the Eagles from 2003 to 2007, played with New Zealand in the 2004 and 2008 Olympic games.
Xavier Cooks was named as one of three replacement players for the Australian Boomers team for the 2020 Tokyo Olympics.

References

External links
 

 Basketball Training